Jean de Brun de Boades was a French Navy officer. He served in the War of American Independence.

Biography 

In 1778, he commanded the 64-gun Lion, part of the squadron under Louis de Fabry de Fabrègues, along with the 74-gun Destin and Victoire, the 64-gun Hardi and Caton, and the frigates Gracieuse and Flore.

On 14 May 1781, he commanded the 74-gun Actif and pursued British ships off Brest. On the morning of 15, he engaged the 64-gun HMS Nonsuch, which managed to escape. Actif returned to Brest on 18. In recognition of his action, the Crown awarded him a 1000-Livre pension.

On 20 August 1784, he was promoted to Chef d'Escadre.

Boades' nephew, the Chevalier de Boades, also the served in the French Navy. He commanded the frigate Magicienne and died of wounds sustained at the Battle of the Chesapeake where he commanded the 64-gun Triton.

Sources and references 
 Notes

Citations

Bibliography
 
 

External links
 
 

French Navy officers
French military personnel of the American Revolutionary War